Kyle Puccia is an American recording artist, songwriter, composer, vocal coach, music-director and producer.

Biography
Kyle Puccia, an American songwriter, composer and musician based in Los Angeles, was born in Watertown, New York and graduated from State University of New York at Fredonia. His most notable cowrite to date, “Kids In Love”, is the title track and first single from Kygo that debuted at No. 1 on Billboard's Top Dance/Electronic Albums chart. Puccia also has seven cuts on Sony Music artist Miss Li's Swedish Grammy nominated album, including the singles “Bonfire”, which was A-listed on Swedish radio for several weeks, and “The Day I Die (I Want You To Celebrate)”, which played on mainstream radio in Sweden and Norway. Puccia's songs have also charted on Billboard's Top 40 Hot Dance Club Play & Top 10 UK Commercial Pop Charts. Puccia has composed dozens of scores for Microsoft commercials and he has garnered song placements on such TV shows/films/brands as HBO, Pretty Little Liars, The Vineyard, Tori & Dean: Home Sweet Hollywood on Oxygen, DTLA on "LOGO", The Masked Saint and Naomi & Ely's No Kiss List.

He music-directed and created vocal arrangements for Los Angeles and Las Vegas productions of Broadway's 1980s rock musical, Rock Of Ages, with Kyle Gass of Tenacious D., Dan Finnerty of The Dan Band, Jack Blades, Katharine McPhee and other notable talent.

He has released three full-length solo albums; Identity in 2004, Bipolar, Part One in 2008 and Sell Out in 2010. His duet EP with Diana Meyer "Pink Thunder" was released in August 2012.

Philanthropy
Puccia is also an active philanthropist and has co-created the "Open Artist Movement", which produces a yearly benefit concert for Lifeworks, a mentorship program for LGBT youth.  As part of this yearly concert, Puccia has performed alongside of noteworthy artists including JoJo, Blake Lewis, Guy B, Kelly King, Alec Mapa, Wilson Cruz, Darryl Stephens, Kina, The Beat Freaks & Jody Watley.

References

External links 
 Kyle Puccia Profile

1970 births
Living people
American male pop singers
People from Watertown, New York
Musicians from New York (state)
Songwriters from New York (state)
State University of New York at Fredonia alumni
American male songwriters